Agathotoma aculea is a species of sea snail, a marine gastropod mollusk in the family Mangeliidae

Description
The length of the shell attains 6 mm, its diameter 2 mm.

(Original description) The small shell is purple brown, banded with white, or is varicolored. The protoconch consists of 1½ loosely coiled, smooth whorls. The teleoconch contains four subsequent whorls. The axial sculpture shows six, somewhat sigmoid rounded, light-colored ribs continuous up the spire, with excavated, much wider interspaces, with fine axial striation, which slightly wrinkles the spirals. The spiral sculpture sows numerous sharp, often paired grooves separated by wider flattish interspaces which are faintly marked by the axial striation. The aperture is narrow and measures about ⅓ the total length of the shell. The anal sulcus is conspicuous. The outer lip is thickened, smooth inside. The columella is simple. The siphonal canal is hardly differentiated.

Distribution
This marine species was found off Cape San Lucas and Magdalena Bay, Baja Californica

References

  Bouchet P., Kantor Yu.I., Sysoev A. & Puillandre N. (2011) A new operational classification of the Conoidea. Journal of Molluscan Studies 77: 273-308. 
  Tucker, J.K. 2004 Catalog of recent and fossil turrids (Mollusca: Gastropoda). Zootaxa 682:1-1295.

aculea
Gastropods described in 1919
Molluscs of Mexico